Cycas desolata is a species of cycad, native only to Queensland.

References

desolata
Endemic flora of Queensland
Taxa named by Paul Irwin Forster